Nole may refer to:

People
 Andreas de Nole (1598–1638), Flemish sculptor
 Francescantonio Nolè (born 1948), Italian archbishop
 Raffaele Nolè (born 1984), Italian footballer
 Rene Nole, a member of the 1960s vocal group The Forum
 Nole, a nickname of Novak Djokovic (born 1987), Serbian tennis player
 Nole, early nickname of Novica Zdravković (1947–2021), Serbian folk singer
 Nole Nokie Edwards (1935–2018), American guitarist best known for his work with The Ventures
 Nolé Marin (born 1969), American former owner/director of AIM Model Management and reality show judge

Other uses
 Nole, Piedmont, Italy, a comune (municipality)
 Nole, capital city of Noland in L. Frank Baum's Oz novels